The 2009 Portuguese motorcycle Grand Prix was the fourteenth round of the 2009 Grand Prix motorcycle racing season. It took place on the weekend of 2–4 October 2009 at the Autódromo do Estoril located in Estoril, Portugal.
The MotoGP race was won by Jorge Lorenzo with Casey Stoner finishing second.

MotoGP classification

250 cc classification

125 cc classification

Notes

Championship standings after the race (MotoGP)
Below are the standings for the top five riders and constructors after round fourteen has concluded.

Riders' Championship standings

Constructors' Championship standings

 Note: Only the top five positions are included for both sets of standings.

References

Portuguese motorcycle Grand Prix
Portuguese
Motorcycle Grand Prix